Javier Andrés Correa (born July 17, 1976 in San Carlos de Bariloche, Río Negro) is an Argentine sprint canoeist who competed from the late 1990s to the mid-2000s. He won four medals at the ICF Canoe Sprint World Championships with two silvers (K-1 1000 m: 2001, 2002) and two bronzes (K-1 500 m: 2001, K-1 1000 m: 1998).

Correa also competed in three Summer Olympics, earning his best finish of fifth in the K-1 1000 m event at Sydney in 2000. He also won the Platinum Konex Award from Argentina in canoeing in 2010.

References

1976 births
Living people
Sportspeople from Bariloche
Argentine male canoeists
Pan American Games gold medalists for Argentina
Canoeists at the 1996 Summer Olympics
Canoeists at the 2000 Summer Olympics
Canoeists at the 2004 Summer Olympics
Olympic canoeists of Argentina
ICF Canoe Sprint World Championships medalists in kayak
Pan American Games medalists in canoeing
Canoeists at the 2003 Pan American Games
Medalists at the 2003 Pan American Games
21st-century Argentine people